Karapiro may refer to:

Karapiro Power Station, a hydroelectric power station on Waikato River, in the North Island of New Zealand
Karapiro (New Zealand electorate)
Lake Karapiro, an artificial reservoir lake on the Waikato River, southeast of Hamilton in New Zealand's North Island